Ri Hung-ryong (born 22 September 1988) is a North Korean footballer. He represented North Korea on at least two occasions between 2007 and 2008.

Career statistics

International

References

1988 births
Living people
Sportspeople from Pyongyang
Kim Il-sung University alumni
North Korean footballers
North Korea youth international footballers
North Korea international footballers
Association football midfielders
Wolmido Sports Club players